An Ambiguous Report About the End of the World (Czech: Nejasná zpráva o konci světa) is a 1997 Czech film directed by Juraj Jakubisko. It is a symbolic story of ill-fated love set in central Europe.

Synopsis
A magical and realistic vision of an unbalanced world takes place in a village in the mountains at the end of the world - at an unknown time. The village in a picturesque setting is a metaphor for the world and humanity at the rise of the 3rd millennium. During the 25 years when the story takes place, we can see change over several generations and various symbols of different civilizations, church and culture. The main motif of the film is the love between Verona and Goran. Their passionate relationship is so different from any other and so they have to be punished in the name of so-called morality and equality. By following them, the village people are trying to hide their transgressions against nature and themselves. Patriarchal rituals are in conflict with a civilization without God and equality. Nature punishes them with earthquakes. The houses of all the guilty people are destroyed. Wolves are a symbol of danger.

Cast 
 Deana Horváthová - Verona
 Milan Bahúl - Goran
 Joachim Kemmer - Madina
 Klára Issová - Veronika
 Jana Švandová - Marlyn
 Jirí Krytinár - Juzek
 Vladimír Javorský - Semek
 Pavel Landovský - Rychtar, the magistrate
 Peter Simun - The Barber
 Yvetta Kornová - Margot
 Sandra Pogodová - Fagot
 Lucie Vondrácková - Lucie
 Vladimir Sadilek - Pop
 Matěj Hádek - Michal

Director about the movie
“Apart from Nostradamus and the visions of the future you can hear my own worries about mankind in this absurdity. There are hidden parts in every single person and when they wake up it's hatred and violence that accompany people from the birth. The prayer of my actors at the end is also my prayer. I only hope that recognition and humility won't come after the tragedy as Nostradamus said. Somewhere in death there is something hidden that keeps my curiosity alive, perhaps human energy, God, faith in accordance with modern thinking and fear about man's future.”

Awards
  Taos Talking Pictures Film Festival 1998  • Prize for visual contribution in cinematography
  San Diego Film Festival 1998  • Prize for the Best Director
  Special prize for direction awarded by Slovak Literary fund 1998  • Prize for the Best Director
  Montreal World Film Festival 1997  • Prize for the Greatest Artistic Contribution and Cinematography of the year
  Czech Lion awards 1997  • Prize for the Best actress supporting role  • Prize for The Best music • Prize for the Best film editing • Prize for the Best sound
  Pescara Golden Dolphin 1997  • Prize for the Best Director

The film was shown at more than 60 international film festivals

External links
 New York Times Review
 An ambiguous report about the end of the world trailer
 An ambiguous voyage to the end of the world - Making of the film
 An ambiguous report about the end of the world Soundtrack
 An ambiguous report about the end of the world: Verona's prayer (Official music video)

1997 films 
Czech drama films
Nostradamus
Magic realism films
Czech Lion Awards winners (films)
Films directed by Juraj Jakubisko
1990s Czech-language films